The Clayburn Pottery was an English pottery works based in Milner St, Hanley, Stoke-on-Trent.

History
The company was established in 1953 and ceased trading by 1960. The Clayburn pottery produced hand painted decorative wares such as lamp bases, small bowls, jugs and cruet sets. These were complementary to the products of the Midwinter Pottery, and Clayburn was established by William Lunt, who was a director of Midwinter. This link was strengthened by the arrival of Roy Midwinter as another director of the company.

Many of the designs Clayburn produced were similar to those of the Midwinter Pottery, and were intended to sell alongside them. Examples include lamp bases that matched a Midwinter dinner service. In particular, the Midwinter Pottery designer Jessie Tait produced versions of her Fiesta, Prima Vera and Tropicana designs for Clayburn.

References
MIDWINTER A Collector's guide - Alan Peat, Cameron and Hollis, 1992,  (Now being reprinted on demand)
Midwinter Pottery - Steven Jenkins, Richard Dennis, 2003, 

Ceramics manufacturers of England
Companies based in Stoke-on-Trent
Staffordshire pottery
Design companies established in 1953
Companies disestablished in 1960
1953 establishments in England
1960 disestablishments in England
Privately held companies of England